Ancroft Northmoor is a village in Northumberland, England. The population of the Civil Parish taken at the 2011 census was 895.

Governance  
Ancroft Northmoor is in the parliamentary constituency of Berwick-upon-Tweed.

References

Villages in Northumberland